The following is a list of lakes in Peru. Many of the names have the ending -cocha, from Quechua qucha: lake.

Acucocha
Alcacocha
Arapa
Aricota
Belaunde
Carpa
Chauya
Choclococha
Huacachina
Imiria
Jucumarini
Junin
Quishuar Lakes
Langui Layo
Lagunillas
Lauricocha
Loriscota
Llanganuco Lakes
Marcapomacocha
Mucurca
Palcacocha
Paca
Pacucha
Parinacochas
Parón
Paucarcocha
Pelagatos
Pías
Pomacanchi
Pumacocha
Punrun
Querococha
Conococha
Colorcocha
Rimachi
Salinas
Sandoval
Saracocha
Sausacocha
Sauce
Shegue
Sibinacocha
Suches
Titicaca
Tragadero
Umayo
Orcococha
Valencia
Vizcacha
Huangacocha
Huarmicocha
Huaroncocha
Huascacocha
Huichicocha
Vilacota
Huiñaymarca
Yanawayin
Yanaqucha

See also

List of lakes
List of lakes by area
List of lakes by depth
List of lakes by volume

References

 
Peru
Lakes